Metallolophia devecisi  is a moth of the family Geometridae first described by Claude Herbulot in 1989. It is found in western Malaysia.

References

Moths described in 1989
Pseudoterpnini